Patricia R. Bellock (born October 14, 1946) is a former Republican member of the Illinois House of Representatives, representing the 47th district from 1998 to 2018.  The district, since the 2001 remap, encompasses a portion of southeastern DuPage County.

Bellock serves on six committees: Aging, Human Services, International Trade and Commerce, Financial Institutions, Developmental Disabilities and Mental Illness, and Registration and Regulation.

On August 1, 2017, Bellock announced her intention to retire at the end of her term. She later chose to resign early and allow the Republican nominee for the 2018 general election, Deanne Mazzochi, to be appointed by local Republican leaders to the seat.

During the 2008 Republican Party presidential primaries, Bellock ran to be a delegate to the 2008 Republican National Convention from Illinois's 13th congressional district for the presidential campaign of former Governor Mitt Romney.

References

External links
 Representative Patricia R. Bellock (R) 47th District at the Illinois General Assembly
 98th, 97th, 96th, 95th, 94th, 93rd
 State Representative Patti Bellock constituency site
 Patti Bellock for State Representative
 
 Patricia R. Bellock at Illinois House Republican Caucus]

Republican Party members of the Illinois House of Representatives
1946 births
Living people
Women state legislators in Illinois
Politicians from Chicago
21st-century American politicians
21st-century American women politicians